Valkyrja is the seventh full-length album by Faroese viking metal/folk metal band Týr. It was announced on 22 July 2013 and released on 16 September 2013 through Metal Blade Records.

Track listing

Personnel
Heri Joensen – guitars, vocals
Terji Skibenæs – guitars
Gunnar H. Thomsen – bass
George Kollias – drums
Liv Kristine – guest vocals

References

2013 albums
Metal Blade Records albums
Týr (band) albums
Albums produced by Jacob Hansen